Gordon is a civil parish in Victoria County, New Brunswick, Canada.

For governance purposes it is divided between the village of Plaster Rock and the local service district of the parish of Gordon, both of which are members of the Western Valley Regional Service Commission (WVRSC).

Origin of name
The parish was named in honour of Arthur Hamilton-Gordon, Lieutenant Governor of New Brunswick at the time.

History
Gordon was erected in 1864 from Grand Falls, Perth, and Saint-Léonard Parishes. Three months later the Carleton County line was restored to its pre-1854 course, removing part of Gordon.

In 1871 all of Gordon north of a line true east and west from the southern end of Long Island in the Tobique River was erected as Lorne Parish.

In 1896 the boundary with Lorne was altered.

Boundaries
Gordon Parish is bounded:

 on the north by a line running true east and west from the foot of an unnamed island downstream of Long Island in the Tobique River;
 on the northeast by the Northumberland County line;
 on the southeast by the York County line;
 on the south by the Carleton County line;
 on the west by the Royal Road, running a northerly or north-northwesterly course starting on the county line north of Chapmanville at a point about 20.5 kilometres inland from the Saint John River, passing west of Birch Ridge, through Red Rapids, to a point slightly east of the junction of Currie Road with Route 380;
on the northwest by a line running north 45º east about 7 kilometres to meet the northern line of the parish.

Communities
Communities at least partly within the parish. bold indicates an incorporated municipality; italics indicate a name no longer in official use

  Anderson Road
  Anfield
  Arthurette
 Arbuckle
 Beveridge
 Birch Ridge
  Crombie Settlement
 Fraser
  Hazeldean
 Lampedo
 Licford
 Longley
 Lower Anfield
 Mapleview
 McLaughlin
 North View
  Odell
 Picadilly
  Plaster Rock
 Red Rapids
 Rowena
 St. Almo (Reeds Island)
  Sisson Ridge
 Summit
 Three Brooks
 Wapske
 Weaver

Bodies of water
Bodies of water at least partly within the parish.

 River de Chute
 Gulquac River
 Lake Branch River
 Little Gulquac River
 Little Wapske River
 Odell River
 Odelloch River
 Pokoiok River
  North Branch Southwest Miramichi River
 Tobique River
 Tuadook River
 Wapske River
 Lampedo Branch
 more than 20 officially named lakes

Other notable places
Parks, historic sites, and other noteworthy places at least partly within the parish.
 Indian Brook Protected Natural Area
 Oven Rock Brook Protected Natural Area
 Plaster Rock-Renous Wildlife Management Area
 Pokiok River Protected Natural Area

Demographics
Parish population totals do not include Plaster Rock

Population
Population trend

Language
Mother tongue (2016)

See also
List of parishes in New Brunswick

Notes

References

Parishes of Victoria County, New Brunswick
Local service districts of Victoria County, New Brunswick